Pokorný (feminine Pokorná) is a Czech or Slovak surname, meaning "the humble one", and may refer to:
 Adolf Pokorny (1895–?), Austrian dermatologist
 Amos Pokorný (1890–1949), Czech chess master
 Bedřich Pokorný, Czech communist state security officer
 Franciszek Pokorny (1891–1966), Polish Army officer
 Frank Pokorny (1923–1999), American politician
 František Pokorný (1905–?, Czech sport shooter
 František Xaver Pokorný (1729–1794), Czech Classical era composer and violinist
 Franz Pokorny (1797–1850), Austrian theatre manager
 Gene Pokorny (born 1953), American tubist
 Hermann Pokorny (1882–1960), Hungarian general
 Jakub Pokorný (born 1996), Czech footballer
 Jaroslava Pokorná (born 1948), Czech actress
 Josef Pokorný (born 1955), Czech rower
 Julius Pokorny (1887–1970), comparative linguist from Austria–Hungary and expert in Celtic languages
 Lia Pokorny (born 1971), Hungarian actress
 Miloslav Pokorný (1926–1948), Czech ice hockey player
 Petr Pokorný (born 1975), Czech footballer
 Petr Pokorný (1933–2020), Czech theologian
 Regina Pokorná (born 1982), Slovak chess player
 Vladimír Pokorný (born 1980), Czech footballer

Czech-language surnames
Slovak-language surnames